Ever since the 2007 municipal reform, the Social Democrats had held the mayor's position in Roskilde Municipality. In the 2017 election, they had won their first absolute majority in the municipality. It would be Joy Mogensen who would continue following this result.

Following the 2019 Danish general election, Joy Mogensen received the offer to become minister of Church and Culture. She would eventually accept and step down as mayor.
Tomas Breddam would become the new mayor following the resignation of Joy Mogensen.

Joy Mogensen had received the 5th highest number of personal votes in the 2017 Danish local elections, despite Roskilde Municipality only being the 14th most populated municipality in Denmark. Her popularity would become even more evident, when the results of this election had been counted. The Social Democrats would lose 7 seats, and win 9 seats in total. Danish Social Liberal Party had prior to the election said that they'd neither support a red nor blue mayor. Without them, the red bloc had won 15 seats, while the blue bloc had won 14 seats. However Danish Social Liberal Party would later announce, that would be ready to support Jette Tjørnelund from Venstre as mayor. This came after the other blue parties wanted to have Lars Lindskov from the Conservatives become the new mayor. However, Liberal Alliance was sceptical on Jette Tjørnelund becoming the mayor. Therefore, no candidate appeared to have a majority behind them. In the end Danish People's Party decided to join the red bloc parties of the Social Democrats, Green Left and Red–Green Alliance. This would see Tomas Breddam continue as mayor.

Electoral system
For elections to Danish municipalities, a number varying from 9 to 31 are chosen to be elected to the municipal council. The seats are then allocated using the D'Hondt method and a closed list proportional representation.
Roskilde Municipality had 31 seats in 2021

Unlike in Danish General Elections, in elections to municipal councils, electoral alliances are allowed.

Electoral alliances  

Electoral Alliance 1

Electoral Alliance 2

Electoral Alliance 3

Results

Notes

References 

Roskilde